James Mavor Moore  (March 8, 1919 – December 18, 2006) was a Canadian writer, producer, actor, public servant, critic, and educator. He notably appeared as Nero Wolfe in the CBC radio production in 1982.

Life and work
Moore was born in Toronto, Ontario, to Francis John Moore, an Anglican theologian, and Dora Mavor Moore, who helped establish Canadian professional theatre in the 1930s and 1940s. His mother was born in Glasgow, the daughter of economist James Mavor.

Moore began acting at the age of six on the Hart House Stage, and continued throughout his high school career at the University of Toronto Schools. Subsequently, he took up radio acting to pay his way through college.  He received a BA degree from the University of Toronto in 1941. Moore served in the Canadian military as an Intelligence officer during World War II. Following the War, he was employed by CBC Radio, becoming its producer for International Service (based in Montreal). He transferred to CBC Television in 1950, serving as its first chief producer.

He was among the pioneers of Canadian television in the 1950s, and was the creator of the CBC National News, later known as The National. Moore selected the program's first regular newsreader, Larry Henderson.

Moore is well known for his contributions to drama, having created more than 100 plays, documentaries, musicals, and librettos for stage, radio and television. From 1970 to 1984 he taught theatre history as a professor at York University, and chaired its theatre department (1975-1976). He was named to the Canada Council in 1974, and was the first artist to chair the council (1979-1983). He received three Peabody Awards for his radio documentaries produced on behalf of the United Nations.

Moore was the founding chair of the British Columbia Arts Council (1996-1998). He sat on the first Board of Governors of the Stratford Festival. He was the founding chair of the Canadian Theatre Centre, the Guild of Canadian Playwrights, and was a founding director of the Charlottetown Festival.

In 1973 Moore was made an Officer of the Order of Canada and was promoted to Companion in 1988. In 1999 he was appointed to the Order of British Columbia. He received the Governor General's Performing Arts Award, Canada's highest honour in the performing arts, in November 1999. He received a total of seven honorary degrees during his lifetime.

Publications and notable works
Reinventing Myself (1994), Moore's autobiography
Sunshine Town (1954), a musical retelling of the Stephen Leacock biography
The Ottawa Man (1958), a musical drama
Louis Riel (1967), an opera composed by Harry Somers for which Moore wrote the libretto
 Johnny Belinda Musical play by Mavor Moore and John Fenwick, Charlottetown Festival, 1968
 Belinda CBC Television adaptation of the musical, telecast March 9, 1977
Fauntleroy (1980)

Other artistic activities
Moore and his mother worked together to found the New Play Society, for which he served as producer/director of Spring Thaw, the society's annual comedy revue (1948-1965).
He wrote a theatre critic section for the Toronto Telegram (1958-1960), and was arts critic for the Maclean's magazine (1968-1969).

Family
Moore married Darwina Faessler in 1943. They had four daughters, including Charlotte Moore and Tedde Moore, both Dora Mavor Moore Award winners. His second marriage, in 1968, was to Phyllis Grosskurth, ending in divorce in 1978. In 1980 he married opera singer Alexandra Browning, who survived him. He died in 2006, aged 87, after several years of ill health.

His grandson is actor and music producer 40.

Filmography

References

External links
 Mavor Moore fonds
 
Mavor Moore Interview, Legend Library, TheatreMuseumCanada
 Canadian Communications Foundation biography
 CBC obituary
 Identifying Mavor Moore by Allan Boss, Ph.D.
 Discovering Mavor Moore by Allan Boss, Ph.D.

1919 births
2006 deaths
20th-century Canadian dramatists and playwrights
Canadian male film actors
Canadian male stage actors
Canadian male television actors
Companions of the Order of Canada
Fellows of the Royal Society of Canada
Male actors from Toronto
Members of the Order of British Columbia
University of Toronto alumni
Upper Canada College alumni
Writers from Toronto
Academic staff of York University
Governor General's Performing Arts Award winners
Canadian male dramatists and playwrights
20th-century Canadian historians
20th-century Canadian male writers
Canadian male non-fiction writers